Unsworth Heights is a suburb of North Shore in the Auckland metropolitan area in northern New Zealand. New Zealand State Highway 18 (Upper Harbour Highway) passes to the north of the suburb, and the Albany Highway to the south. The two routes intersect just to the west of Unsworth Heights. Unsworth Reserve is to the east.

Demographics

Unsworth Heights had a population of 5,889 at the 2018 New Zealand census, an increase of 387 people (7.0%) since the 2013 census, and an increase of 639 people (12.2%) since the 2006 census. There were 1,860 households, comprising 2,889 males and 3,003 females, giving a sex ratio of 0.96 males per female, with 945 people (16.0%) aged under 15 years, 1,335 (22.7%) aged 15 to 29, 2,766 (47.0%) aged 30 to 64, and 849 (14.4%) aged 65 or older.

Ethnicities were 45.8% European/Pākehā, 5.0% Māori, 3.8% Pacific peoples, 42.3% Asian, and 10.1% other ethnicities. People may identify with more than one ethnicity.

The percentage of people born overseas was 56.5, compared with 27.1% nationally.

Although some people chose not to answer the census's question about religious affiliation, 40.2% had no religion, 42.9% were Christian, 0.2% had Māori religious beliefs, 4.4% were Hindu, 3.5% were Muslim, 2.0% were Buddhist and 2.5% had other religions.

Of those at least 15 years old, 1,656 (33.5%) people had a bachelor's or higher degree, and 525 (10.6%) people had no formal qualifications. 909 people (18.4%) earned over $70,000 compared to 17.2% nationally. The employment status of those at least 15 was that 2,583 (52.2%) people were employed full-time, 684 (13.8%) were part-time, and 174 (3.5%) were unemployed.

Education
Westminster Christian School was established in 1981 to provide education for children of Christian families, using a Christ-centred curriculum founded on a Biblical World View. It is an inter-denominational, state-integrated, co-educational, full primary school for students from New Entrant to Year 8. The school has a roll of  students as of

Notes

Suburbs of Auckland
North Shore, New Zealand